Center Township is a township in Jewell County, Kansas, USA.  As of the 2000 census, its population was 1,100.

History
Center Township was organized in 1872. It was named for its location in the geographical center of Jewell County.

Geography
Center Township covers an area of 35.83 square miles (92.8 square kilometers); of this, 0.02 square miles (0.06 square kilometers) or 0.06 percent is water.

Cities and towns
 Mankato (the county seat)

Adjacent townships
 Holmwood Township (north)
 Richland Township (northeast)
 Washington Township (east)
 Buffalo Township (southeast)
 Calvin Township (south)
 Ionia Township (southwest)
 Limestone Township (west)
 Burr Oak Township (northwest)

Cemeteries
The township contains three cemeteries: Lutheran, Mount Hope and Saint Teresa.

Major highways
 U.S. Route 36
 K-14
 K-28

Airports and landing strips
 Mankato Airport

References
 U.S. Board on Geographic Names (GNIS)
 United States Census Bureau cartographic boundary files

External links
 US-Counties.com
 City-Data.com

Townships in Jewell County, Kansas
Townships in Kansas